Excoecaria canjoerensis is a species of flowering plant in the spurge family, Euphorbiaceae. It was described in 1818. It is native to India.

References

canjoerensis
Plants described in 1818
Flora of India (region)